Also see Chilean Cuarta Division.

The Paraguayan Cuarta División is the fourth tier football league in Paraguay. It is organized by the Asociación Paraguaya de Fútbol.

The Paraguayan Cuarta División is divided into three leagues:

 The Primera División C (disputed within Asunción and the Central Department.
 The Qualification from the Unión del Fútbol del Interior to the Primera División B Nacional called Primera División C Nacional (disputed by clubs in Paraguay's interior)
 Paraguay's regional leagues (disputed by each department except Asunción and the Central Department)

Primera División C

List of champions
Seasons from 1997 until 2007 were Segunda de Ascenso, and from 2008 are Primera División C.

Titles by club

See also
 Football in Paraguay
 Paraguayan football league system
 Primera División Paraguaya
 División Intermedia
 Paraguayan Tercera División
 Paraguayan Primera División B
 Primera División B Nacional
 Campeonato Nacional de Interligas
 Unión del Fútbol del Interior
 Paraguayan women's football championship

References

4
Para